Atheism in Christianity: The Religion of the Exodus and the Kingdom is a 1968 book by German Marxist philosopher Ernst Bloch. The book offers a third way to the Christian/atheist either/or debate. Gareth Jenkins from Socialist Review says that Bloch "argues that there are liberatory, 'atheist' elements within Christianity with which socialists should make common cause."

Reception

Nicholas Lezard of The Guardian called the book "exhilarating to read".

See also
 Christian atheism

References

External links
Illuminations: Ernst Bloch, Utopia and Ideology Critique By Douglas Kellner
Ernst-Bloch-Zentrum
Ernst Bloch Assoziation
Centre for Ernst Bloch Studies, University of Sheffield

1968 non-fiction books
Books by Ernst Bloch
Criticism of Christianity
German-language books
German non-fiction books
Religious studies books